In cybernetics and control theory, a setpoint (SP; also set point) is the desired or target value for an essential variable, or process value (PV) of a control system. Departure of such a variable from its setpoint is one basis for error-controlled regulation using negative feedback for automatic control.

Examples

Cruise control

The SP-PV error can be used to return a system to its norm. An everyday example is the cruise control on a road vehicle; where external influences such as gradients cause speed changes (PV), and the driver also alters the desired set speed (SP). The automatic control algorithm restores the actual speed to the desired speed in the optimum way, without delay or overshoot, by altering the power output of the vehicle's engine.  In this way the SP-PV error is used to control the PV so that it equals the SP. A widespread use of SP-PV error control is the PID controller.

Industrial applications

Special consideration must be given for engineering applications. In industrial systems, physical or process restraints may limit the determined set point. For example, a reactor which operates more efficiently at higher temperatures may be rated to withstand 500°C. However, for safety reasons, the set point for the reactor temperature control loop would be well below this limit, even if this means the reactor is running less efficiently.

See also
Process control

References

Classical control theory
Control devices
Control engineering
Control loop theory
Cybernetics
Process engineering